Jacobus Karel Christoffel "Kallie" Reyneke (8 February 1922 – 15 September 2009) was a South African racewalker. He competed in the men's 10 kilometres walk at the 1948 Summer Olympics.

References

1922 births
2009 deaths
Athletes (track and field) at the 1948 Summer Olympics
South African male racewalkers
Olympic athletes of South Africa
Place of birth missing